Iglesia de la Santa Cruz may refer to:

 Iglesia de la Santa Cruz (Cangas de Onís), Asturias, Spain
 Iglesia de la Santa Cruz (Inguanzo), Asturias, Spain
 Iglesia de la Santa Cruz (Puerto Vallarta), Jalisco, Mexico